Nationality words link to articles with information on the nation's poetry or literature (for instance, Irish or France).

Events
 Nicholas Rowe made British Poet Laureate in succession to Nahum Tate.
 Mary Monck, dying in Bath, England, writes affecting verses to her husband, not published until 1755.

Works published

United Kingdom
 Susanna Centlivre, A Poem. Humbly Presented to His most Sacred Majesty George, King of Great Britain, France and Ireland. Upon His Ascension to the Throne
 Charles Cotton, The Genuine Works of Charles Cotton, posthumously published
 Samuel Croxall, The Vision
 Daniel Defoe, published anonymously, attributed to Defoe, A Hymn to the Mob
 Alexander Pope:
 The Temple of Fame
 Translator, The Iliad of Homer, Volume I (Books 1–4), followed by Volume II (Biooks 5–8) in 1716, Volume III (Books 9–12) in 1717, Volume IV (Books 13–16) in 1718, Volume V (Books 14–21) and Volume VI (Books 22–24), both in 1720
 Matthew Prior, Solomon, or The Vanity of the World, a didactic poem
 Thomas Tickell, translation, The First Book of Homer's Iliad
 Isaac Watts, Divine Songs Attempted in Easy Language for the Use of Children, including "How doth the little busy Bee"; 10 editions published by 1753

Other
 Antoine Houdart de La Motte, Réflexions sur la critique, attacking those who admire the ancients uncritically; criticism in France

Births
Death years link to the corresponding "[year] in poetry" article:
 February 12 – William Whitehead (died 1785), English poet and playwright
 March 7 – Ewald Christian von Kleist (died 1759), German poet
 May 4 – Richard Graves (died 1804), English poet and novelist
 July 4 – Christian Fürchtegott Gellert (died 1769), German poet
 October 1 – Richard Jago (died 1781), English clergyman and poet
 November 5 – John Brown (died 1766), English clergyman, author and poet
 Undated
 Tadhg Gaelach Ó Súilleabháin (died 1795), Irish poet
 Jakob Immanuel Pyra (died 1744), German poet

Deaths
Birth years link to the corresponding "[year] in poetry" article:
 May 19 – Charles Montagu, 1st Earl of Halifax (born 1661), English poet and statesman
 July 30 – Nahum Tate (born 1652), Irish-born Poet Laureate
 Undated – Mary Monck (born c. 1677), Anglo-Irish poet

See also

Poetry
List of years in poetry
List of years in literature
 18th century in poetry
 18th century in literature
 Augustan poetry
 Scriblerus Club

Notes

18th-century poetry
Poetry